Shattered Faith is an American punk rock band from Southern California. Formed in 1978 by Kerry Martinez, currently guitarist for U.S. Bombs, and Spencer Bartsch, now lead vocalist for Firecracker 500, the group featured songs with a political and biblical bent. Shattered Faith emerged from the Southern California punk scene, among the more notable bands China White and The Vandals, along with other SoCal punk rock bands.

Band members 
Current
Spencer Bartsch – lead vocals
Denny McGahey – guitar
Bobby Tittle – bass
Steven Shears – drums
Branden Bartsch – guitar

Past
Chris Moon – drums
Richard "Skitchblade" Katchadoorian – drums
Kerry Martinez – lead guitar

Discography

Albums 
Live! (1982 – Prophet Recording Company)
Volume III (2016- Hostage Records)

 Singles and EPs 
"I Love America" / "Reagan Country" (7", - Posh Boy – 1981)Vol. 2 (12", EP – Slag Records – 1985)Power to the Kids (Hostage Records – 2014)Modern Convenience (Hostage Records – 2014)

 Compilation albums Rodney on the Roq: Volume 2'' – "Right Is Right" (Posh Boy Records 1981)

References

External links 

[ Allmusic]

Musical groups from Orange County, California
Punk rock groups from California
Musical groups established in 1978